Loze Mountain is a mountain,  high, surmounting the west wall of Grautskåla Cirque in the Humboldt Mountains of Queen Maud Land, Antarctica. It was discovered and plotted from air photos by the Third German Antarctic Expedition, 1938–39, and was mapped from air photos and surveys by the Sixth Norwegian Antarctic Expedition, 1956–60. It was remapped by the Soviet Antarctic Expedition, 1960–61, and named after "Lose Platte," a name applied by the German expedition to an indeterminate feature in the area.

References

Mountains of Queen Maud Land
Humboldt Mountains (Antarctica)